Hassan Muhammad was a prominent historian of the Segamat. He was born in Segamat, Johore on 22 April 1930. He received his early education at the Tanjong Malim Training School (1936-1941), then at Segamat Boys School (1941–45). After that he was offered to further his study at the Sultan Idris Teachers College (SITC) now known as the Sultan Idris Education University, Tanjong Malim, Perak. He was the youngest student to succeed in pursuing his studies over there at that particular time. After completing his studies at SITC he continued to serve as a qualified teacher and was the youngest teacher in Johore at that time. In 1962 he passed the Federal Malayan Certificate (FMC) and was the first local student from the Malay stream to pass the examination. Then he was appointed as the youngest principal in the District of Segamat.

Historian of Segamat
In 1966, he had been offered to pursue his study at the Institut Pendidikan Guru Bahasa Melayu Campus (Language Institute in Lembah Pantai Kuala Lumpur). There, he gained the opportunity to master the fields of language and history, in formal. He conducted research and study on Segamat history and customs and came out with an official manuscript, appropriately.

He was appointed as
 a Secretary of the Malaysian Historical Society for Segamat District,
 a committee member of the Malaysian Historical Society for the State of Johore
 a committee member of the National Archives for Southern Region.

In the Malaysian Historical Society, he was very close to Dato' Haji Ahmad Arshad who was also the chairman of the Malaysian Historical Society for Segamat District.

His final involvement and commitments in the Malaysian Historical Society was when being appointed as
 a member of working committee for the Malaysian Historical Society Convention, event held in Johor Bahru in 1978.

Independent Writer
He was also active in writing. Among his contributions in the form of writings that of high scientific and historical values were:
 The Dialects of the people of the Residency of Jabi in Segamat.
 Malaysia, A Day Without History.
 The Rescued of Sultan Mahmud Shah by Bendahara Tepok.
 The Origin of Segamat.
 The Life of Aboriginal in "Segamat Kecil".
 The Secret Route from the Straits of Malacca to the South China Sea.
 The Malay Customs of Segamat.
 Tok Bertiga Segamat

All his written works were based upon his thorough investigation and research studies carried out, in details recorded and written in manuscript and extracted for publishing in the form of reports, books and articles. These are his master-pieces and his original property rights.

References

 ©Hassan Muhammad (1968), Original Writer. Manuscript: Sejarah dan Adat Resam Segamat (Translated as The History and Local Custom of Segamat). Language Institute Kuala Lumpur.
 ©Seth Yusof @Ibnu Yusof (1996), Editor and Commentator. Adat Resam Melayu Segamat (Translated as The Malay Custom of Segamat). Al-Kafilah Enterprise. 

20th-century Malaysian historians
1930 births
1993 deaths
Possibly living people 
People from Johor
Malaysian schoolteachers